Aet Laigu (pseudonym Al Wallcat) is an Estonian film producer and director.

She has founded the Estonian production company Meteoriit.

Filmography

 2016 "Ema" (feature film; scenarist)
 2018 "Tuliliilia" (feature film; producer, scenarist) 	
 2019 "The Chuck Band Show ('Ühemeheshow') (feature film; director and scenarist)

References

Living people
Year of birth missing (living people)
Estonian film producers
Estonian film directors
Estonian women film producers
Estonian women film directors